Yan Lianke (born August 1958) is a Chinese writer of novels and short stories based in Beijing. His work is highly satirical, which has resulted in some of his most renowned works being banned in China.
He has admitted to self-censorship while writing his stories in order to avoid censorship.

His novels include Serve the People!, Lenin's Kisses, and Dream of Ding Village. He has also published more than ten volumes of short stories.

Yan won the Franz Kafka Prize in 2014 and has been shortlisted for the Man Booker International Prize twice. His style is described as experimental and surreal, employing a self-described "mythorealism".

Life
Yan Lianke was born in Song County, Henan Province, China. Though he lives in Beijing, he has said that his heart remains in Henan, and he has based numerous works on life in Henan, including Dream of Ding Village. He entered the army in 1978. He graduated from Henan University in 1985 with a degree in politics and education. In 1991, he graduated from the People's Liberation Army Art Institute with a degree in Literature.

His childhood house was demolished by a farmer who believed that Yan's offers of money were bad faith attempts to lowball the true value, and he demolished the house in hopes of raising the land value, not realizing that the value came from the structure being Yan's house.

Literary career

Fiction 
He published his first short story in 1979. He has published 14 novels and over 40 short stories.

His early writings are mostly Realist pieces heavily influenced by 19th century Realism. But towards the end of the 1990s his style displayed a major change. His subsequent works are more infused with wild imagination and creative allegories. His sometimes myth-like dramatic plots are often allegorical depictions of the human conditions.

A number of his fictions are set in the natural environment of Balou Mountain. It has become the most important setting of Yan's literary world, and the most noted fictional landscape created in Chinese literature. This is particularly true with the publication of the “Balou Mountain Series” comprising The Passing of [Riguang liunian], Hard as Water [Jianying rushui] and Lenin’s Kisses [Shouhuo] around 2000. The depictions of Chinese history and reality in these novels are characterised by a sharp edge which is simultaneously profound, absurd and carnivalesque. Yan's protagonists are strange in behavior, and psychologically twisted and complex. This represents another major change in Yan's style from his earlier works. They often provoke surprise in his readers and critics, and debates and controversies at the time of their publication.

Yan became “sensitive” in China at the time of publication of Lenin’s Kisses. He openly challenged what he described as Realism of the spirit(s) [Shengshi zhuyi], and advocated for a return to “a realism that transcends reality”. This has revived the prolonged debate in the Chinese literary circles on Realism. In France, the French translation of Lenin’s Kisses has also received critical acclaim. Its translations in other languages have been equally popular. A writer of Le Monde rates Yan's writings highly, and rates him one among the great writers in the world. The same writer suggests that Yan distinguishes himself with his sophisticated insights on the society expressed in his fictions, and that his writings often shows a devastating humour. The Guardian describes him as a master of satire with a rich imagination. Vanity Fair (Italy) notes Yan's mastery in writing between magic and reality..The Frankfurt Christian Science Monitor suggests that Yan possesses both the talent for writing great works and the courage to confront difficult issues. The Japanese magazine The World considers Yan and his writings important setters of standard for Chinese literature and freedom of expression.

The bans imposed on Serve the People and Dream of Ding Village garnered him notoriety.

The Four Books was published in 2011 in Taiwan. It was also around the same time when he advocated a Realism of the spirit(s) [Shengshi zhuyi], purporting that Chinese literature should represent “the invisible reality”, “the reality that is covered up by reality”, and “the non-existing reality”. This advocacy in the construction of an “absolute reality” is put into practice in his own novels The Explosion Chronicles and The Dimming Sun. The characters in these works are “Chinese through-and-through”. Their plots are depictions of a reality that is “Chinese through-and-through”, but filled with imaginative “possibilities” and “mytho-realist” “impossibilities”, which express his vision of his China being a “dark”, “desperate” place where the idea of “future” only brings “anxieties”.

These works are his practice of his avowed aspiration in Discovering Fiction [Faxian xiaoshuo] to create a Chinese literature endowed with the modern spirit of world literature, and differentiate themselves from Western Surrealism, Absurdism and Magical Realism, and that is modern and belongs to the East. In this sense, Yan can be appreciated as a writer of world literature. His novels Serve the People, Dream of Ding Village, Lenin’s Kisses, The Four Books and The Explosion Chronicles have been translated into a number of languages and distributed widely in the Americas, Europe and the Australia. Almost all these translations have attracted attention and critical acclaim for the novels in their respective literary markets. Further, The Explosion Chronicles extended its fame to Africa, being shortlisted with Carlos Rojas' English translation for the GPLA 2017.

In terms of the contents, Yan's fictions have all shown tremendous anxieties in his vision of “the Chinese people”, Chinese reality and history. In terms of generic treatment, every one of his novels has displayed a new structure and linguistic style. To many it is his diverse styles, his readiness to break norms, and his capacity to create new literary norms that have differentiate him from other Chinese writers. It is in this connection that he describes himself as “a traitor of literary writing”. His is a pioneer of 20th Century Chinese literature, and is the only Chinese writer who has gained international acclaim without any support, either strategic or financial, of the Chinese Government.

Literary criticism 

Yan is the only contemporary Chinese creative writer who has systematically published critical appreciations of 19th and 20th century literatures. These include numerous speeches and dialogues he has given and participated in around the globe, and various pieces of theoretical writings. They are collected in My Reality, My -ism [Wode xianshi, wode zhuyi], The Red Chopsticks of the Witch [Wupo de hong kuaizi], Tearing Apart and Piling Up [Chaijie yu dieping], Selected Overseas Speeches of Yan Lianke [Yan Lianke haiwai yanjiang ji], and Silence and Rest [Chenmo yu chuaixi]. In these works he expresses in detail his understanding of Chinese literature, world literature, and the changes literature has gone through in the past decades. His 2011 publication Discovering Fiction [Faxian xiaoshuo] is an exegesis of his re-discovery of 19th and 20th century Chinese literature and world literature. The book is characterised by his personal style of argument and rationality. It is also in this book that he advocates the differentiation of “full causal relations”, “zero causal relations”, “half causal relations” and “inner causal relations” in the plots of fiction. He considers this a “new discovery” of fiction writing, and designates it a “Mytho-realism” of Chinese literature. This is the first attempt from a Chinese writer active in the international literary circles to contribute to the theoretical discussions of Realism in the global context. This view of his has been discussed in the academe internationally.

In 2016 Yan was appointed Visiting Professor of Chinese Culture by the Hong Kong University of Science Technology to teach writing courses. The course material is collected in Twelve Lectures on 19th Century Writings and Twelve Lectures on 20th Century Writings. They contain his analyses of and arguments about the most influential writers of world literature in the 19th and 20th centuries. Of the two Twelve Lectures on 20th Century Writings is more influential, since it represents an attempt of a Chinese writer to review and research on in a comprehensive manner the dissemination and impacts of 20th century world literature on China. It can be used as a research reference or a writing guide.

In the area of critical and theoretical writings, Yan Lianke is the most prolific and vocal among contemporary Chinese writers. Not all writers and critics agree with his views, but he is widely recognised as being unique among contemporary Chinese writer in terms of his persistence in reflecting on methodologies of creative writing.

Essays 

Yan's body of creative works include not only fiction, but also a number of lyrical essays which read in contrast to his fiction. While his fiction is characterized by an acute sense of contemporaneity, rich imagination and a compelling creative impulse, his essays are characterised by a conventional aesthetic of the Chinese essay which comes across as gentle, lyrical, and showing much finesse.

His long essay My Father’s Generation and Me [], House No.711 [711 hao yuan] and his other collections of essays mostly depict the daily life of the Chinese people, and nature in the four seasons, in a lyricism that comes across familiar to Chinese readers. The styles of his fiction and that of his essays are so different that it is difficult to reconcile them as the same body of works by a single writer. His non-fiction works have created an image of the author in both positive and negative light, so that the author becomes a figure who is rich and multi-faceted in his personality.

Novels

Serve the People!

Set during the Cultural Revolution, at the peak of the cult of personality of Chairman Mao, the novel tells the story of an affair between the Liu Lian, the wife of a powerful military commander, and a young soldier, Wu Dawang. The two lovers discover that destroying objects related to Chairman Mao, such as the little red book, is a sexual kink for them. The book is a commentary on the choices people were forced to make during the Cultural Revolution.

The title is a reference to a phrase originally coined by Mao Zedong in a 1944 article of the same name that commemorated the death of the red army soldier Zhang Side. During the Cultural Revolution, this article was required reading for millions of Chinese, and the slogan was widely used. Due to the sex scenes and political content, the story attracted controversy when it was featured the magazine Huacheng in 2005. The Chinese government ordered the publisher to recall all 40,000 copies of the magazine, which in turn created huge demand for the novel.

Dream of Ding Village

Yan's novel Dream of Ding Village is a novel about people with AIDS trying to survive with little outside help. Yan visited AIDS sufferers and even lived with villagers for periods of time to make sure the novel was accurate. Dream of Ding Village has been compared with Albert Camus' The Plague (1947). Dream of Ding Village was published in Hong Kong in 2006, where it was again banned by the Chinese government for its content.

Other major works 

Yan started publishing in 1979. So far the body of works he has produced includes 15 novels, more than 50 novellas, more than 40 short stories, 3 extended essays, 5 collection of essays, 6 collections of literary criticisms, and about a dozen TV and film scripts, amount to over 10 million Chinese characters. However, because of both the controversial nature of and the Chinese government's ban on his works, a considerable part of this body of works has not been published in China. These include the novels Serve the People [Wei renmin fuwu], Dream of Ding Village [Dingzhuang meng], The Four Books, [Sishu], The Dimming Sun [Rixi], and a range of his essays and speeches. Many of his works have been translated and circulated in more than 30 languages including English, French, German, Spanish, Italian, Swedish, Danish, Norwegian, Czech, Hungarian, Japanese, Korean, Vietnamese, Mongolian and Portuguese.

Works

Novels

Short story and novella collections

Essay collections

Translated works
This is a partial list of Yan's novels.

Awards and honours
1997 Lu Xun Literary Prize for "Huang Jin Dong"
2001 Lu Xun Literary Prize for "Nian Yue Ri"
2005 Yazhou Zhoukan, "The Best Ten Books Award" for Dream of Ding Village.
2004 Lao She Literary Award for Enjoyment
2005 Asia Weekly 10 Best Novels award for Dream of Ding Village
2011 Man Asian Literary Prize, Dream of Ding Village, longlist. 
2014 Franz Kafka Prize, winner.
2016 Man Booker International Prize, The Four Books, shortlist.
2016 Dream of the Red Chamber Award, Death of the Sun, winner.
2017 Grand Prix of Literary Associations, The Explosion Chronicles, shortlisted in the Belles-Lettres Category.
2017 Man Booker International Prize, Long listed The Explosion Chronicles 
2021 Newman Prize for Chinese Literature 
2021 Elected a Royal Society of Literature International Writer

See also
Hu Jia
Plasma Economy
Weiquan movement

References

External links

Yan Lianke at The Susijn Agency
Yan Lianke at Paper Republic
Discussion of Two Novels about Blood Selling 
Being Alive is Not Just an Instinct. An interview with Yan Lianke about "Dream of Ding Village"
The Four Books by Yan Lianke cover art and synopsis at Upcoming4.me
Chinese novelist Yan Lianke describes quarantine in Beijing written by Riccardo Moratto
An Interview with Yan Lianke by Riccardo Moratto

1958 births
People's Republic of China translators
Living people
Writers from Luoyang
Chinese male short story writers
20th-century Chinese translators
21st-century Chinese translators
Chinese male novelists
Henan University alumni
Academic staff of Renmin University of China
20th-century Chinese short story writers
21st-century Chinese short story writers
20th-century Chinese male writers
21st-century male writers
People's Republic of China short story writers
Short story writers from Henan